Sukhaangphaa (fl. 1293–1332) was the 4th Ahom king.

Reign
Under Sukhaangpha, the Ahom kingdom entered into the first major conflict with their neighbors.  The Ahom kingdom fought a long war, beginning about 1324, against the Kamata king Pratapdhvaj. The war did not end in a win for either but concluded in a truce with Sukhangpha marrying princess of Kamatapur Rajanee, the sister of Pratapdhvaj.

Expedition to Kamatapur
Sukhannpha pursued an expedition to Kamatapur. But the king of Kamatapur made a treaty by giving his daughter to Sukhaangpha. The Rajanee Aai. He got one prince namely  Chao Pulai. Later on Sudangpha (the Bamuni Konwar) married Bhajani Aai

See also 
 Ahom Dynasty

Notes

References 

 Gait, Edward A. (1906) A History of Assam, Calcutta
 Gogoi, Padmeshwar (1968), The Tai and the Tai kingdoms, Gauhati University
 Borbarua, Hiteswar (2018), Ahomar Din, Publication Board Assam

Ahom kings
Ahom kingdom
13th-century Tai people
14th-century Tai people
13th-century births
1330s deaths
Year of birth unknown
Year of death uncertain